Sardinian is conventionally divided, mainly on phonological criteria, into three main varieties: Campidanese, Logudorese, and Nuorese. The last of these has a notably conservative phonology, compared not only to the other two varieties, but also to other Romance languages as well.

Vowels 

Sardinian vowels are lengthened under primary stress, especially in open syllables.

Sardinian vowels have long been subject to a process of metaphony whereby  are raised to [e o] if the following syllable contains a high vowel (either  or ).

The new  produced by this change failed, however, to trigger metaphony in preceding syllables, as original  had. For instance, the older  'well' and  'come' became  and  respectively, a minimal pair distinguished only by their stressed vowels.

† Only in Campidanese.

Consonants 
Sardinian possesses the following consonant phonemes:

† Variable presence, depending on dialect.

‡ Mainly in Nuorese.

Plosives
The Sardinian system of plosives cannot be exhaustively characterized by either qualitative (voicing) or quantitative (duration) contrasts, but both contrasts must be specified independently on some level of grammar. All plosives participate in a system-wide and complex process of lenition that characterizes all varieties of Sardinian and operates across word boundaries.

There are three series of plosives or corresponding approximants:
 Voiceless or fortis stops derive from their Latin counterparts in composition after another stop, from utterance-initial voiceless stops and from Latin geminates (typically voiceless).
 As in most Romance languages,  are unaspirated, with  a dental .
 When intervocalic, voiceless stops undergo lenition by voicing. When applicable, they escape voicing by becoming long or half-long in the opposite process of fortition; when this happens, their spelling is inconsistent, with some preferring etymological (double) spelling and others phonemic (single).
 In Nuorese, which maintains etymologically single voiceless stops, these merge with etymologically double ones as voiceless fortis. Individual words and morphemes may display independent voicing ( < Lat. ) and even deletion ( < Lat. ).
 Etymologically double and postconsonantal voiced stops do not contrast with single ones in any variety, even in Nuorese, and are typically realised as voiced geminates.
 Voiced or lenis "stops" derive from single Latin stops (voiced or voiceless), and are commonly realised as approximants  between vowels, as in Spanish ( less commonly). Latin single voiced intervocalic stops are generally reflected as zero in Logudorese and Campidanese; this can also apply across word boundaries, resulting in consonants disappearing when in combination.
  occurs mainly in intervocalic position, where it is realized as the geminate , representing the regular outcome of Latin .

Fricatives
 Apico-alveolar realizations of  predominate in the centre of the island, encompassing the entire Nuorese-speaking area and extending to Sennariolo in the west and Seulo in the south. Mura describes an apico-postalveolar or retroflex realization in the eastern parts of this region.
Geminate  never voices.
, derived from Latin  or Greek , is characteristic of the Nuorese dialects. This may be the result of influence from Logudorese, where  is the regular outcome.
In most Nuorese varieties, word-initial , if followed by a vowel, is lost. The exceptions are:
Nuoro, and areas to its northwest, where it remains as-is.
Otherwise, Sardinian has merged Latin  into .
, written -sc(i/e)- or -sç-, is pronounced as single  at the beginning of a word, and strengthened to  otherwise.
 , written -x- and never phonetically long, is its voiced counterpart.
'window' < Sp. . Nevertheless, in some varieties it has become a phoneme that itself exhibits a fortis allophone: Camp., Log. 'to accustom'.

Affricates
  is dentalized laminal  or  written -tz-. It corresponds to Italian -z- or -ci-, the latter especially in loanwords. In contrast to  it is very advanced, tending towards the interdental  in central varieties, and then spelled th.
It mainly stems from the Latin yod  after consonants in Logudorese ( 'son' < ,  'January' < ), but also corresponds to Italian -gi- or -ggi- in loanwords.
  is written -c(i/e)- or -ç-.
  is written -g(e/i)- or -j-. In Campidanese, it stems from the Latin yod  after consonants ( 'son' < ,  'January' < ) as well as from the palatalization of Latin . In many varieties, this sound undergoes lenition to  when intervocalic.

Nasals
  is variously but commonly realised as fortis (geminate) inside the stressed syllable, and for this reason (as well due to etymology) is often spelled double.
 Intervocalic  commonly undergoes lenition in Campidanese, giving a glottal stop, pharyngeal fricative or disappearing, with vowel nasalization: Sarrabus  'new year'.
 , written -gn- or -nny-/-nni- (the palatal nasal for some speakers or dialects, although for most the pronunciation is ).

Liquids and rhotics
 Sardinian has a single-rhotic system.  contrasts with  intervocalically (the only such contrast besides ), with the former surfacing as a tap  and the latter as a trill . In other positions the trill is an allophone of the tap.
 Especially in Campidanese, intervocalic  is subject to lenition both word-internally and across word boundaries, giving rise to [      ∅]. Some of these realisations are written with b or u: ,  'sun'.
  is strengthened to geminate retroflex  in order to escape lenition in those varieties where it is affected. It thus may freely alternate with the lenition outcomes, although strengthening is nowadays more common.
It can also be found as the closing element in diphthongs, when these arise phonetically: ,  'pole, stake' < .

Labiovelars 

 Outside of the above sequences,  only occurs in loanwords.

Processes

Neutralizations
Most varieties are characterised by the historic neutralization of Latin  and  into the archiphoneme  within the morpheme:  'rock'. The Campidanese dialect does not generally allow this  to end syllables except if followed by another ; as a result, underlying  sequences are synchronically and systematically repaired, either through assimilation or metathesis:
 One strategy moves the rhotic to the leftmost available position within a phrase, sometimes jumping several syllables:  >  'the bow', but  >  if none is available. The intervocalic consonant that's left is regularly fortis (geminate).
 When  is harmonically followed by the voiceless coronal , assimilation occurs:  >  >  'tall'.
 When followed by the voiced coronal , another type of metathesis is frequent:  >  'deaf'.
 Recent Italian borrowings tend to maintain the coda  as a function of register: It.  >  ~  > .
 In some varieties located at the north of the island, any etymological liquid in coda surfaces as a voiced lateral fricative  or a palatal glide.

  and  alternate in Campidanese Sardinian, but not Nuorese.

Sandhi
The first three of these alternate in notable external sandhi processes. For Nuorese,  and  neutralise (merge) when in sandhi in the following way:
  before word-initial voiceless obstruents except  and :   'three pieces of bread',   'four pieces of bread';
 total assimilation before word-initial , ;
 variable total assimilation in allegro speech before word-initial .
 Parallel outcomes occur word-internally with the prefixes dis-, is-.

The word-final  is assimilated to the following consonant within a phrase, or can be said to disappear, inducing strengthening: Log.   '(s)he wants to come'.

Morphosyntactic gemination
Unlike Tuscan Italian, Neapolitan and Sicilian, Sardinian doesn't have a productive process of syntactic gemination since most Latin final consonants have been maintained. Nevertheless, there are a few lexical items that formerly ended in consonants, and thus prevented initial-consonant weakening (lenition); as a result, consonants occurring after these words undergo strengthening, typically by gemination. These include the conjunction  'and' < La. , the preposition  'to, at' < La.  as well as the interrogative particle  < La.

Comparison with other languages 
Several features distinguish Sardinian, although not necessarily all its dialects, from other Romance varieties.
This is another strikingly archaic feature that was shared by African Romance.
 Absence of diphthongizations found in many other Romance languages; for example,  >  '(s)he can' (Italian , Spanish , Romanian );  >  'good' (Italian , Spanish ). This is shared by several Central-Southern Italian varieties, with many displaying various types of metaphony reminiscent of Sardinian.

Sardinian contains the following phonetic innovations:
 Change of the Latin -ll- into a retroflex , shared with Sicilian, Southern Corsican as well as historically in Gascon; for example,  >  'coral' and  >  'village, town'.
 A small area on the Nuorese territory conserves Latin :  alongside  <  for all three possible outcomes.
 Metathesis as in  >  'to hug, to embrace'.
 Vowel prothesis before an initial r in Campidanese, similar to Basque and Gascon:  > / 'king' (Basque );  >  'wheel' (Gascon , Basque );  > Sardinian and Gascon  'river'.
 Vowel prothesis in Logudorese before an initial s followed by consonant, as in the Western Romance languages:  >  'written' (Spanish , French ),  >  'star' (Spanish , French )
This also applies across word boundaries:  'pig', but   'the pig';  'time', but   'the time';  'house', but  'the house'.<div>

 All varieties show paragogic vowels: the vowel of the final syllable ending in a consonant is copied after it to form a new open syllable, which undergoes the usual lenition (voicing) processes: Log.   / Camp.   'strangers'. This is only present before pause, and may be variable with some speakers.
 After resonants, this vowel is sometimes etymological and sometimes not, leading to variation in spelling: Nuo. 'name' < ;  'to do' < .
 A similar epenthetic vowel has been lexicalized in most varieties in monosyllables: Camp.  'you' < .

 Logudorese and Nuorese display vowel insertion before initial  clusters, less typical of Campidanese (examples above); the latter displays it before word-initial : Camp. , Log.  <  'reddish'.

Notes

References

Bibliography 
 Blasco Ferrer, Eduardo. 2017. Il latino e la romanizzazione. In Blasco Ferrer, Eduardo; Koch, Peter; Marzo; Daniela (eds.), Manuale di linguistica sarda, 85–103. Berlin: De Gruyter.
 Contini, Michele. 1987. Etude de géographie phonétique et de phonétique instrumentale du sarde. Alessandria: Edizioni dell'Orso.
Jones, Michael A. 1988. Sardinian. In Harris, Martin; Vincent, Nigel (eds.), The Romance languages, 314–350. London: Routledge.
Jones, Michael A. 1997. Sardinia. In Maiden, Martin; Mair, Parry, (eds.), The dialects of Italy, 376–384. London: Routledge.
 Loporcaro, Michele. 2015. Vowel length from Latin to Romance. Oxford University Press.
 Mensching, Guido; Remberger, Eva-Maria. 2016. Sardinian. In Ledgeway, Adam & Maiden, Martin (eds.), The Oxford guide to the Romance languages, 270–291. Oxford University Press.
 Mura, Riccardo; Virdis, Maurizio. 2015. Caratteri e strutture fonetiche, fonologiche e prosodiche della lingua sarda. Cagliari: Condaghes.
 Pittau, Massimo. 1972. Grammatica del sardo-nuorese: Il più conservativo dei parlari neolatini. Bologna: Pàtron.
 Wagner, Max Leopold. 1951. La lingua sarda: Storia, spirito e forma. Berne: Francke.

Sardinian language
Italic phonologies